John Scott (April 24, 1824 – September 23, 1903) was an American politician, businessman, lawyer, and soldier.

Born in Jefferson County, Ohio, Scott taught school in Ohio and Kentucky. He studied law in Ohio and was admitted to the Ohio bar. While in Kentucky, he enlisted in the army and took part in the Mexican–American War. In 1854, Scott settled in Nevada, Iowa, where he practiced law and was in real estate. He was elected to the Iowa State Senate. During the American Civil War, Scott was a colonel in the 32nd Iowa Volunteer Infantry Regiment. After the Civil War, Scott was elected Lieutenant Governor of Iowa. Scott wrote books about the Scott family and the 32nd Infantry Regiment. He died in Des Moines, Iowa.

References

1824 births
1903 deaths
People from Jefferson County, Ohio
Ohio lawyers
Iowa lawyers
American military personnel of the Mexican–American War
People of Iowa in the American Civil War
Iowa state senators
Lieutenant Governors of Iowa
Writers from Iowa
Writers from Ohio
People from Nevada, Iowa
Union Army colonels
19th-century American politicians